Dome C, also known as Dome Circe, Dome Charlie or Dome Concordia, located at Antarctica at an elevation of  above sea level, is one of several summits or "domes" of the Antarctic Ice Sheet. Dome C is the site of the Concordia Research Station, jointly operated by France and Italy.

History 

In the 1970s, Dome C was the site of ice core drilling by field teams of several nations. It was called Dome Charlie (NATO Phonetic Alphabet code for the letter C) by the U.S. Naval Support Force, Antarctica, and its Squadron VXE-6, which provided logistical support to the field teams. In January and November 1975, three LC-130 Hercules aircraft suffered severe damage during attempted takeoffs from Dome Charlie. In November 1975 and November 1976, the U.S. Navy established field camps on Dome Charlie to recover the aircraft. Following major structural repairs and replacement of engines in the field, the three LC-130s were flown to McMurdo Station on December 26, 1975, January 14, 1976, and December 25 (Christmas Day), 1976.

From November 1977 to March 1978 a French party of 13 settled down in the existing camp left by the aircraft rescuers. They brought several tons of equipment—thanks to the VXE-6 airplanes—and achieved the planned ice-coring campaign down to 980 m bringing to surface, and later on in their labs for study, ice samples 45,000 to 50,000 years old.

During the Antarctic summer of 1979, the camp was re-occupied by Americans and French, under the auspices of the US Antarctic Research Program, sponsored by the National Science Foundation. Deep ice core drilling, meteorology and seismic studies were conducted. The camp, with a maximum summer population of 18, was operated and maintained by four employees of ITT Antarctic Services and one US Navy medical corpsman. When the camp was shut down for the season in about January, 1980, it was left mostly intact, with a radio-isotope powered remote weather station operational.

In 1992, France decided to build a new station on the Antarctic Plateau. The program was later joined by Italy. In 1996, a French-Italian team established a summer camp at Dome C. The two main objectives of the camp were the provision of logistical support for the European Project for Ice Coring in Antarctica (EPICA) and the construction of a permanent research station. The new all-year facility, Concordia Station, became operational in 2005.

The Advisory Committee on Antarctic Names (US-ACAN) considers "Dome Charlie" to be superior to the informal name, "Dome C," and that it has precedence over "Dome Circe", a name suggested from Greek mythology after Circe, the bewitching queen of Aeaea island, one of the children of solar god Helios and the Oceanid nymph Perse, who changed men into animals by magic, by members of the SPRI airborne radio echo sounding team in 1982. Later, it was named "Dome Concordia" after that same French/Italian scientific base.

Climate 

Dome C is one of the coldest places on Earth. Temperatures hardly rise above  in summer and can fall below  in winter. Humidity is low and it is also very dry, with very little or no precipitation throughout the year.

Dome C does not experience the katabatic winds typical of the coastal regions of Antarctica because of its elevated location and its relative distance from the edges of the Antarctic Plateau. Typical wind speed in winter is 2.8 m/s (6 mph).

Dome C is situated on top of the Antarctic Polar Plateau, the world's largest frozen desert ever. No animals or plants live at a distance of more than a few hundred meters from the Southern Ocean. It is believed that these seabirds have learned to cross the frozen white continent instead of circumnavigating it.

Astronomical observatory 

Dome C is notable for its potential to be an extremely good astronomical observation site; the transparency of the Antarctic atmosphere allows stars to be observed, even when the Sun is at its highest possible elevation angle of 38°. The good viewing is due to very low infrared sky emission, extremely low humidity, a high percentage of cloud-free time, low atmospheric aerosol and dust content, and freedom from light pollution and background light other than auroras and moonlight. This location was a serious candidate for the ESO's E-ELT project. However, sky coverage is less than at lower latitude locations as northern celestial hemisphere objects never rise or are too low above the horizon.

The Proceedings of the Astronomical Society of the Pacific discuss the suitability of the site for astronomy in terms of the seeing. They determined the median seeing (measured with a Differential Image Motion Monitor placed on top of an  tower) to be 1.3±0.8 arcseconds. This is significantly worse than most major observatory sites, but similar to other observatories in Antarctica. However, they found (using balloons) that 87% of turbulence was below 36 meters. A telescope built on a tower could rise above this "boundary layer" and achieve excellent seeing.

An earlier paper considered the site and concluded that "Dome C is the best ground-based site to develop a new astronomical observatory". This shows a measured superior seeing of 0.27 arcseconds, half as large as at Mauna Kea Observatory. This figure was taken with an instrument insensitive to near-ground turbulence and so it is comparable to the 0.35 arcseconds Agabi et al. measured for "free atmospheric seeing".

The 2004 experiments to measure the astronomical conditions at the site were unattended, controlled by a computer system that had to supervise the generation of its own electricity using a jet-fuel powered Stirling engine.  The computer, running Linux, communicated with the outside world using an Iridium phone.

ESA research 
Since Concordia Station is a prime space mission analogue, the European Space Agency conducts biomedical research there in collaboration with the French (IPEV) and Italian (ENEA/PNRA) Antarctic programs. Living conditions upon Dome C simulate what Astronauts have to go through in long-duration spaceflights. To name a few of the common challenges that the Concordia crew and Astronauts have to face, they both live in isolation and confinement, in different atmospheric pressure conditions, with an abnormal day/night cycle plus several effects on their everyday life, such as sleep difficulties. Obviously the above parameters influence not only physiology but also psychology. The European Space Agency (ESA) hires a Medical Doctor each year to winterover at Concordia Station and facilitate biomedical experiments on the crew. These experiments are selected over a variety of tests proposed to ESA by European universities and participation from the rest of the crew is voluntary (and highly appreciated). It is important to mention that this research aims not only at improving living conditions for Astronauts in a future human journey to Mars, but the results are also applied directly on society - they help doctors devise therapies for patients with similar difficulties in Europe and elsewhere.

See also 

 Belgica Subglacial Highlands
 Climate of Antarctica
 Concordia Station
 Dome A (or Dome Argus)
 Dome F (or Dome Fuji)
 EPICA
 Inaccessibility Pole
 Law Dome
 Ledoyom (Ice body)
 List of mountains of Wilkes Land
 Pole of Cold

References

External links 
 Another Dome C FAQ (Guillaume Dargaud)
 First Winterover at Concordia Station (2005) blog by Guillaume Dargaud
 2nd Winterover at Concordia Station (2006) blog by Eric Aristidi, LUAN (Laboratoire Universitaire d'Astrophysique de Nice)
 Official website of Concordia Station Institut Polaire Français - Paule Emile Victor (IPEV) and Programma Nazionale di Ricerche in Antartide (PNRA)
 Dome C seeing, Nature Letter Frequently Asked Questions about seeing at Dome C.
 International Large Optical Telescope, is proposed as a 2m optical-quality telescope for Dome C
 Michael C. B. Ashley
 Site evaluation of E-ELT of ESO including this location.
 OpenStreetMap
 Alexei Rudoy. Прошлогодний снег. - Climate, ice, water, landscapes 

Ice caps of Antarctica
Outposts of Antarctica
Wilkes Land